Hypolycaena philippus, the purple-brown hairstreak or common hairstreak, is a butterfly of the family Lycaenidae. It is native to sub-Saharan Africa where it is commonly found in wooded locations.

The wingspan is 22–28 mm for males and 23.5–31 mm for females. Females lack the purple sheen which is present on the upper wings of males, and instead have submarginal white markings on their hind wings. Adults are on wing year round in warmer areas with peaks in November and March or April.

The larvae feed on Clerodendrum glabrum, Ximenia species (including X. caffra and X. americana), Deinbollia species (including D. oblongifolia), Vangueria species (including the inside of fruits of V. randii), Maytenus senegalensis, Allophylus, Loranthus, Punica granatum, other Clerodendrum, Coccinia grandis and Ixora.

Subspecies
Hypolycaena philippus philippus – mainland sub-Saharan Africa
Hypolycaena philippus ramonza (Saalmüller, 1878) – Madagascar, Aldabra, Cosmoledo, Comoro Islands

References

External links

Die Gross-Schmetterlinge der Erde 13: Die Afrikanischen Tagfalter. Plate XIII 67 a

Butterflies described in 1793
Hypolycaenini